The Palestinian Authority Government of 1996 was a government of the Palestinian National Authority (PA) formed following the first general elections held on 20 January 1996 in the Palestinian territories after the conclusion of the Oslo Accords in 1993. The general election was for the President of the PA and for members of the Palestinian Legislative Council (PLC). The Government was headed by Chairman of the PLO, Yasser Arafat, and functioned until the appointment of the Abbas Government on 29 April 2003. The Government was approved by the PLC, but there were no rules as to the term of the Government. Ministers were just appointed and dismissed by Arafat.

The government was chosen and appointed by PA President Arafat, and Arafat also presided at meetings of the "Council of Ministers".

Powers and jurisdiction
Pursuant to the Oslo Accords, the PA Government had only authority over some civil rights of the Palestinians in the West Bank Areas A and B and in the Gaza Strip, and over internal security in Area A and in Gaza. One of the security tasks was the security cooperation between Israel and the Palestinian Authority, which inter alia aimed at the prevention of Palestinian attacks on the Israeli army and settlers.

In 1997, the Palestinian Legislative Council approved the Basic Law, which was not signed by Arafat until 29 May 2002. This 2002 Basic Law stipulated that it only applied to the interim period set by the Oslo Accords. According to the Law, the Legislative Council (which should approve the Government) as well as the President of the Palestinian Authority (who should appoint the Ministers) were envisioned to function until the end of the interim period. The interim period had in fact ended on 5 July 1999.

2003 Basic Law changes
After the dismissal of the Government, no elections were held. On 18 March 2003, Arafat signed the 2003 Amended Basic Law, which transformed the political system into a semi-presidential one. The post of Prime Minister was created, who became responsible for the composition of the Cabinet and became the Chairman of the "Council of Ministers".

Mahmoud Abbas was named as the proposed first Prime Minister on 6 March 2003, and appointed on 19 March 2003. Abbas became the head of the next Government on 29 April.

See also
 Palestinian Legislative Council
 Palestinian Authority Government of June 2002
 Palestinian Authority Government of October 2002

References

Palestinian National Authority governments
Cabinets disestablished in 1998
Cabinets established in 1996
1998 disestablishments in the Palestinian territories
1996 establishments in the Palestinian territories